This is a list of notable Jewish American activists. For other Jewish Americans, see Lists of Jewish Americans.

A
Dinah Abrahamson (1954–2013), politician and activist for the African-American Lubavitch community
Martin Abern (1898–1949), communist youth movement leader
Bernard Ades (1903–1986), civil rights lawyer
Lori Alhadeff (born 1975), school safety activist
Saul Alinsky (1909–1972), community activist and theorist
 Gloria Allred (born 1941), lawyer and radio talk show host
Lindsay Amer, LGBTQ Youtuber and activist

B
Michael Berg (born 1945), environmental activist and Green Party candidate

C
 Maximilian Cohen, American Socialist Party leader
 Zipporah Michelbacher Cohen (1853 – 1944) American civic leader

D
Serge Dedina, environmental activist and politician

F
Abraham Feinberg, anti-Vietnam war activist
Leslie Feinberg, communist butch lesbian transgender organizer. 
Ada Fisher (1947–2022), physician and perennial issues candidate
 Clara Fraser, founder of Radical Women and the Freedom Socialist Party
 Raffi Freedman-Gurspan, LGBTQ activist and first openly transgender White House staffer 
Betty Friedan (1921–2006), feminist writer and women's movement activist
 Sandra Froman, President of the National Rifle Association (NRA), second female president and first Jewish president

G
 Alicia Garza (born 1981), civil rights and Black Lives Matter activist
 Pamela Geller, pro-Israel activist, author, commentator
 Sally Gottesman, consultant for non-profits

H
 Dario Hunter (born 1983), environmental activist attorney and first Muslim-born man to be ordained a rabbi

J
Rashida Jones (born 1976), actress, director, writer, and peace activist

K
 Franklin E. Kameny, gay rights leader
Larry Kramer (1935–2020), LGBT rights activist and playwright
Julie Kushner (born 1952), trade union organizer

L
Sandra Lawson (born 1970), social justice activist and the first ever openly gay black female rabbi
Karen Lewis (labor leader) (1953–2021), educator and labor leader
Ben Linder (1959–1987), engineer and internationalist murdered by Contras while working on hydroelectric projects in Nicaragua
Mark Levin (born 1957), host of a syndicated radio show and a show on Fox News, who worked in the administration of President Ronald Reagan and as a chief of staff for Attorney General Edwin Meese.

M 

 Kenneth L. Marcus, an attorney and activist who founded the Louis D. Brandeis Center for Human Rights Under Law and former Assistant Secretary of Education for Civil Rights in the administration of President Donald Trump.

P
Chanda Prescod-Weinstein, cosmologist, science writer, and equality activist
Dean Preston, member of San Francisco Board of Supervisors, civil rights attorney and tenant rights advocate

R
 Rob Reiner, actor, director, producer, writer and anti-tobacco activist; son of Carl Reiner
Shais Rishon, rabbi and anti-racism activist
David A Rose (judge) (1906–1995), activist for human rights and against anti-Catholic and anti-Jewish bias
 Zelda Rubinstein (1933–2010), actress and human rights activist

S
Max Shachtman, American Marxist and labor activist
Rose Schneiderman (1882–1972), sociologist, feminist activist, and labor union leader
Robert E Segal, activist for displaced people; for housing for Puerto Ricans against discrimination and against anti Semitism.
Norman Siegel (born 1943), civil liberties activist and attorney
Michael Signer, attorney and politician

W
Naomi Wadler (born 2006), student activist against gun violence
Louis Waldman (1892–1982), labor lawyer and founding member of the Social Democratic Federation
Rebecca Walker (born 1969), feminist writer
Bret Weinstein, biology professor and free speech advocate
Harold Willens (1914–2003), anti-nuclear weapons activist

See also 
 Jewish left

Footnotes

Jewish society
Activists
Jewish American